KFC Olympic Burst is a Belgian association football club based in Burst, East Flanders. The club has matricule number 3901 and the club's colours are black and blue. They currently play in East Flanders Division Three in the Belgian Provincial leagues. They play their home games at the Complex Oudendijk in Burst.

History 

The club was founded on 20 August 1943 and joined the Royal Belgian Football Association, with matricule number 3901 being assigned to the team. Burst played in the provincial leagues and did reach the Second Provincial, but was then swiftly relegated back to Third Provincial. They were the winner of their series, Third Provincial D, in season 2009/10, resulting in Burst re-appearing, after a long absence, in the Second Provincial. However, after two seasons, Burst was again relegated back to the Third Provincial in season 2011/12.

Merger plans 

There are ongoing plans for the four remaining clubs from Erpe-Mere (SK Aaigem, KRC Bambrugge, KFC Olympic Burst and FC Mere) to merge. A new stadium will be built on the domain of Steenberg, with an objective of it being ready by 2015. However, the merger is not expected to happen before 2016 at the earliest due to the need for a multi-purpose hall to be built first in Steenberg (source: municipality Erpe-Mere). The new football club will use the matricule number of KRC Bambrugge, that plays in the first provincial league, as the other teams play in lower series. It is thought to be almost certain that there will be black in the new club's colours, because of the four clubs that are still active, and the three clubs who merged into FC Mere, all had black in their club's colours. The K of Koninklijke (Royal) and Erpe-Mere will appear in the new club's name. More information about the name is currently unavailable.

References

External links 
 Site youth Olympic Burst 

Football clubs in Belgium
Erpe-Mere
1943 establishments in Belgium

fr:Burst#Sports